Uganda has many tribes that speak different languages.

The following is a list of all Ugandan tribes in alphabetical order. This list refers to Article 10(a) and the Third Schedule of Uganda´s Constitution (Uganda´s indigenous communities as at 1st February, 1926) which enumerates 65 indigenous communities.

A
Acholi  
Aliba
Alur
Aringa

B-D
Baamba
Babukuso
Babwisi
Bafumbira
Baganda
Bagisu
Bagungu
Bagwe (part of Samia-Bugwe)
Bagwere
Bahehe
Bahororo
Bakenyi
Bakiga
Bakonzo
Banyabindi
Banyabutumbi
Banyankore
Banyara
Banyaruguru
Banyarwanda
Banyole
Banyoro
Baruli
Barundi
Basamia
Basoga
Basongora
Batagwenda
Batoro
Batuku
Batwa
Chope
Dodoth

E-I
Ethur (Acholi-Labwor)
Gimara
Ik (Teuso) 
Iteso

J-K
Jie
Jonam
Jopadhola
Kakwa
Karimojong
Kebu (Okebu)
Kuku
Kumam

L-N
Langi
Lendu
Lugbara
Madi
Mening
Mvuba
Napore
Ngikutio
Nubi
Nyangia

O-Z
Pokot
Reli
Sabiny
Shana
So (Tepeth)
Vonoma

References

Uganda-related lists
Ethnic groups in Uganda